Ternopil is a city in the west of Ukraine. Administratively, Ternopil serves as the administrative centre of Ternopil Oblast. Located on the banks of the Seret, until 1944 it was known mostly as Tarnopol. Ternopil is one of the major cities of Western Ukraine and the historical regions of Galicia and Podolia. It is served by Ternopil Airport. The population of Ternopil was estimated at

Administrative status
The city is the administrative center of Ternopil Oblast (region), as well as of surrounding Ternopil Raion (district) within the oblast. It hosts the administration of Ternopil urban hromada, one of the hromadas of Ukraine.

Demography
According to Ukrainian Census (2001), Ternopil city and Ternopil oblast are homogeneously populated by ethnic Ukrainians. Ternopil city and Ternopil oblast are also homogeneously Ukrainian-speaking.

National structure of Ternopil Oblast  - 1,138.5 (100%)
 Ukrainians - 1,113.5 (97.8%)
 Russians - 14.2 (1.2%)
 Poles - 3.8 (0.3%)

Native languages in Ternopil:
 Ukrainian language — 94,8 %,
 Russian language — 3,37 %,
 Belarusian language — 0,07 %,
 Polish language — 0,04 %,

History

Climate
Ternopil has a moderate continental climate with cold winters and warm summers.

Higher education

Universities include:
 West Ukrainian National University 
 Ternopil Ivan Pul'uj National Technical University
 Ternopil Volodymyr Hnatyuk National Pedagogical University
 Ternopil State Medical University

On 31 December 2013, the 11th Artillery Brigade, descendant of artillery units that had been based in the city since 1949, was disbanded.

Main sights
Ternopil Regional Art Museum
Church of the Exaltation of the Cross, Ternopil
Ukrainian Greek Catholic Cathedral of the Immaculate Conception of The Blessed Virgin Mary
 The sanctuary of Our Lady of Zarvanytsia with a miraculous icon of the 13th century called icon of the Mother of God of Zarvanytsia, sanctuary of Greek-Catholic rite. Located about 40 km from Ternopil, celebrated on 22 July.

People  
 Kazimierz Ajdukiewicz (1890–1963), Polish philosopher and logician, researched model theory
 Henryk Baranowski (1943–2013) a Polish theatre, opera and film director, actor, playwright and poet.
 Vasyl Barvinsky (1888–1963) a Ukrainian composer, pianist, conductor and musicologist
 Eugeniusz Baziak (1890–1962) Archbishop of Lviv and apostolic administrator of Kraków.
 Natalia Buchynska (born 1977), singer, brought up in Ternopil.
 Daria Chubata (born 1940), Ukrainian physician, author and social activist
 Mykola Chubatyi (1889-1975), historian of Ukrainian Church
 Cyryl Czarkowski-Golejewski (1885–1940) aristocratic Polish landowner, Katyn massacre victim.
 Charlotte Eisler (1894-1970) Austrian singer and pianist with the Second Viennese School.
 Kornel Filipowicz (1913–1990) a Polish novelist, poet, screenwriter and short story writer
 Franciszek Kleeberg (1888–1941) a Polish general in the Austro-Hungarian Army
 Bohdan Levkiv (1950–2021) a Ukrainian politician, mayor of Ternopil from 2002 to 2006.
 Pepi Litman (1874–1930) a cross-dressing female Yiddish vaudeville singer
 Kazimierz Michałowski, (1901–1981), Polish archaeologist, Egyptologist and art historian
 Serhiy Nadal (born 1975) a Ukrainian politician; mayor of Ternopil since 2010
 Yuriy Oliynyk (1931–2021) a Ukrainian composer, concert pianist and professor of music in the US
 Jakub Karol Parnas (1884–1949), biochemist, born in Ternopil.
 Joseph Perl, (1773–1839), an Ashkenazi Jewish educator and writer, a scion of the Haskalah
 Simhah Pinsker (1801–1864) a Polish-Jewish scholar and archeologist
 Rudolf Pöch (1870–1921), doctor and anthropologist; pioneer photographer and cinematographer
 Roza Pomerantz-Meltzer (1880–1934) a Polish writer and novelist based in Lviv and politician. 
 Solomon Judah Loeb Rapoport (1786–1867), a Galician and Czech rabbi and Jewish scholar. 
 Karol Rathaus (1895—1954), Polish-Austrian-American modernist composer
 Eduard Romanyuta (born 1992) a Ukrainian singer, songwriter, actor and TV presenter. 
 Baron Lajos Simonyi de Barbács et Vitézvár (1824–1894) a Hungarian politician
 Ruslan Stefanchuk (born 1975) a Ukrainian politician, party chairman and lawyer
 Yaroslav Stetsko (1912–1986), a leader of Organization of Ukrainian Nationalists (OUN) from 1968.
 Oleh Syrotyuk (born 1978) a Ukrainian politician, Governor of Ternopil Oblast in 2014 
 Jan Tarnowski (1488-1561), Polish general and nobleman, founder of Ternopil (as Tarnopol).
 Judd L. Teller (1912–1972) Jewish author, social historian and poet; emigrated to the US in 1921.
 Baroness Adelma Vay (1840–1925), a medium and pioneer of spiritualism in Slovenia and Hungary.

Sport 
 Olga Babiy (born 1989), a Ukrainian chess player and Woman Grandmaster
 Petr Badlo (born 1976) a Ukrainian football manager and former footballer with 470 club caps.
 Olha Maslivets (born 1978) a Russian windsurfer who competed at four Summer Olympics
 Ihor Semenyna (born 1989) a Ukrainian football midfielder with 330 club caps

People from Ternopil Oblast 
 Aleksander Brückner, (1856 in Berezhany – 1939), a Polish scholar of Slavic languages and literature
 Volodymyr Hnatiuk (1871 in Velesniv, Buchach – 1926), Ukrainian writer, literary scholar, journalist and ethnographer.
 Solomiya Krushelnytska (1872 in Biliavyntsi — 1952), an outstanding Ukrainian Soprano
 Bohdan Lepky (1872 in Krehulets – 1941), a Ukrainian writer, poet, scholar, public figure, and artist.
 Ivan Pului (1845 in Hrymailiv – 1918) physicist and inventor, developed use of X-rays for medical imaging.
 Casimir Zeglen (1869 near Tarnopol - 1927), Polish-American engineer, inventor of commercial bulletproof vest
 Serhiy Prytula (born 1981 in Zbarazh), Ukrainian TV show host, political activist, founder of Charity Foundation of Serhiy Prytula

International relations

 
Ternopil is twinned with:

  Sliven, Bulgaria
  Yonkers, United States (since 1991)
  Elbląg in Poland (since 1992)
  Chorzów, Poland
  Prudentopolis, Brazil
  Batumi, Georgia

Former twin towns include:
  Tarnów in Poland
  Pinsk in Belarus

In June 2021, the Polish city of Tarnów decided to suspend its partnership with Ternopil as a reaction to the naming of a stadium in Ternopil in honour of Roman Shukhevych, one of the leaders of the Ukrainian Insurgent Army responsible for the Massacres of Poles in Volhynia and Eastern Galicia between 1943–1945.

In June 2022, due to full-scale Russian invasion and missile strikes from the territory of Belarus, Ternopil suspended its partnership with the city of Pinsk.

Festivals 
An international open-air music festival called  has been held annually near Ternopil for 2–4 days in July since 2013.

Notes

References

Sources
 A. Bresler, Joseph Perl, Warsaw, 1879, passim;
 Allg. Zeit. des Jud. 1839, iii. 606;
 
 J. H. Gurland, Le-Ḳarot ha-Gezerot, p. 22, Odessa, 1892;
 Meyers Konversations-Lexikon
 Orgelbrandt, in Encyklopedia Powszechna, xiv. 409;

External links

 
 Volodymyr Kubijovyč, Roman Mykolaievych, Ternopil in the Encyclopedia of Ukraine, updated in 2012.
 Ternopil City Council
 Ternopil photos
Ternopil City Sights
Website about Ternopil
 Historical footage of war damages at Ternopil (1917), filmportal.de
 

 
Cities in Ternopil Oblast
Ruthenian Voivodeship
Populated places in the Kingdom of Galicia and Lodomeria
Tarnopol Voivodeship
Holocaust locations in Ukraine
Populated places established in 1540
Tarnopol
Cities of regional significance in Ukraine
City name changes in Ukraine
Oblast centers in Ukraine
Jewish communities destroyed in the Holocaust